George Leon Severyn Dobry  (1 November 1918 – 14 March 2018) was a Polish-British barrister and judge.

Dobry was born and raised in Warsaw. He was educated in Edinburgh and at Corpus Christi College, Oxford. He took silk in 1969 and was appointed a CBE in 1977.

He married Margaret Headley Smith (1925-1978) in 1948 and had two daughters, Anthea and Josephine.

References

1918 births
2018 deaths
British barristers
20th-century English judges
Polish emigrants to the United Kingdom
Alumni of Corpus Christi College, Oxford
Lawyers from Warsaw
Commanders of the Order of the British Empire